Finn Ludvig Seemann (18 October 1944 – 7 September 1985) was a Norwegian footballer who played as a striker.

Seemann was born in Oslo. He started his football career in Lyn, where he became league champion in 1964. In 1965, he became professional in the Scottish club Dundee United. After two seasons in Scotland he went to the Netherlands, where he played for DWS and FC Utrecht, and also lived in the United States in a period before he returned to Lyn in 1975. He has also played in Vålerenga, Sarpsborg and Bækkelaget.

He was capped 15 times and scored four goals for Norway. Seemann was also capped three times for Norway in bandy. He appeared in pre-season games as a placekicker for the Houston Oilers in 1973 and 1974.

He died in a car accident in 1985, on the E6 highway near Dovre.

References

Norwegian footballers
1944 births
1985 deaths
Footballers from Oslo
Association football forwards
Lyn Fotball players
Dundee United F.C. players
AFC DWS players
FC Utrecht players
Vålerenga Fotball players
Sarpsborg FK players
Eredivisie players
Norway international footballers
Norwegian expatriate footballers
Expatriate footballers in Scotland
Expatriate footballers in the Netherlands
Norwegian expatriate sportspeople in Scotland
Norwegian expatriate sportspeople in the Netherlands
Norwegian expatriate sportspeople in the United States
Norwegian bandy players
Road incident deaths in Norway
American football placekickers
Footballers who switched code
Norwegian players of American football
Houston Oilers players